The red-and-white spinetail (Certhiaxis mustelinus) is a species of bird in the family Furnariidae, the ovenbirds.
It is found in the Amazon Basin of Brazil and Peru; also the southern Amazon River border of Colombia and the headwaters of the Madeira River in Bolivia.
Its natural habitats are rivers and swamps.

The red-and-white spinetail is found along river corridors in the Amazon Basin. The major rivers are Peru's Ucayali River, and the Amazon Basin's Madeira River, Juruá River, Purús River, and the Amazon River.

References

External links
Photo-Medium Res; Article christinevadai

red-and-white spinetail
Birds of the Amazon Basin
red-and-white spinetail
red-and-white spinetail
Taxonomy articles created by Polbot